Provincial Highway 76 is an expressway, which begins in the border of Puyan, Changhua and Fuxing, Changhua on Jhangshuei Road (Provincial Highway 19) and ends in Caotun, Nantou on (National Highway No. 3).

Length
The total length is 32.644 km.

Major Cities Along the Route
Yuanlin, Changhua
Caotun, Nantou

Exit List
As of 2015, a plan is to extend the expressway from CR 144 in Puyan to Fangyuan.

{| class="plainrowheaders wikitable"
|-
!scope=col|City
!scope=col|Location
!scope=col|km
!scope=col|Mile
!scope=col|Exit
!scope=col|Name
!scope=col|Destinations
!scope=col|Notes
|-

Intersections with other Freeways and Expressways
National Highway No. 1 at Puyan JCT. in Puyan, Changhua
National Highway No. 3 at Zhongxing JCT. in Caotun, Nantou

See also
 Highway system in Taiwan

Notes
Baguashan Tunnel between Lincuo IC. and Zhongxing JCT. was the longest highway tunnel (4.9 km) in Taiwan when opened to traffic in April 2005, although the top rank moved to Hsuehshan Tunnel in National Highway No. 5 in June 2006.

The exact route west of the Provincial Highway No. 19 is undetermined. However, there is an alternative route connecting to West Coast Expressway (Provincial Highway No. 61).

References

http://www.thb.gov.tw/

Highways in Taiwan